In statistics, the Šidák correction, or Dunn–Šidák correction, is a method used to counteract the problem of multiple comparisons. It is a simple method to control the family-wise error rate.  When all null hypotheses are true, the method provides familywise error control that is exact for tests that are stochastically independent, conservative for tests that are positively dependent, and liberal for tests that are negatively dependent.  It is credited to a 1967 paper  by the statistician and probabilist Zbyněk Šidák.The Šidák method can be used to determine the statistical significance, and evaluate adjusted P value and confidence intervals.

Usage
 This test produces a familywise Type I error rate of exactly  when the tests are independent of each other and all null hypotheses are true. It is less stringent than the Bonferroni correction, but only slightly.  For example,  for  = 0.05 and m = 10, the Bonferroni-adjusted level is 0.005 and the Šidák-adjusted level is approximately 0.005116.
 One can also compute confidence intervals matching the test decision using the Šidák correction by using 100  (1 − α)1/m % confidence intervals.
 For continuous problems, one can employ Bayesian logic to compute  from the prior-to-posterior volume ratio.
When there are considerably large numbers of hypotheses or when the hypotheses are correlated, correction factors like Bonferroni and Šidák give in quite conservative results, which leads us to consider other approaches.

Proof

The Šidák correction is derived by assuming that the individual tests are independent. Let the significance threshold for each test be ; then the probability that at least one of the tests is significant under this threshold is (1 - the probability that none of them are significant). Our intention is for this probability to equal , the significance threshold for the entire series of tests.

Šidák correction for t-test

See also 
 Multiple comparisons
 Bonferroni correction
 Family-wise error rate
 Closed testing procedure

References

External links
The Bonferonni and Šidák Corrections for Multiple Comparisons

Multiple comparisons